The Chaoyang Park Beach Themed Park, known as the Chaoyang Park Beach Volleyball Ground during the 2008 Olympic Games, is a swimming, samba, African dance, hula and carnival place in Chaoyang Park that used to be one of 9 temporary venues used for the 2008 Summer Olympics. It was built on the site of the ex-Beijing Gas Appliance Factory but now a part of the park. The ground was used for the beach volleyball matches.

The venue had a capacity of 12,000, consisting of 1 competition ground, 2 warmup grounds, and 6 training grounds. Court 2 was used on Day 6 of competition.

After the Olympics, the venue hosted the Beijing Grand Slam of the FIVB Beach Volleyball World Tour in 2011 and 2012. It also hosted the Beijing Ocean-Beach Carnival every summer since 2009.

References
 Official Website
Beijing2008.cn profile

Venues of the 2008 Summer Olympics
Olympic volleyball venues
Defunct sports venues in China
Volleyball venues in China
Sports venues in Beijing
Beach volleyball in Asia
Beach volleyball venues